Goudstikker (Dutch for "Gold Stitcher", in German Goldstücker) is the name of a Dutch Jewish family. Notable Goudstikkers include:
Jacques Goudstikker (1897–1940), art dealer
Sophia Goudstikker (1865–1924), photographer and feminist pioneer

See also
Theodor Goldstücker (1821–1872), scholar of Sanskrit
List of Dutch Jews